Günter Busarello (27 April 1960 – 8 November 1985) was an Austrian wrestler. He competed at the 1980 Summer Olympics and the 1984 Summer Olympics.

References

1960 births
1985 deaths
Austrian male sport wrestlers
Olympic wrestlers of Austria
Wrestlers at the 1980 Summer Olympics
Wrestlers at the 1984 Summer Olympics
People from Hohenems
Sportspeople from Vorarlberg